Peter Stuart Hopkirk (15 December 1930 – 22 August 2014) was a British journalist, author and historian who wrote six books about the British Empire, Russia and Central Asia.

Biography
Peter Hopkirk was born in Nottingham, the son of Frank Stuart and Mary Hopkirk ( Perkins); his father was an Anglican priest. The family hailed originally from Roxburghshire in the borders of Scotland. He grew up at Danbury, Essex. Hopkirk was educated at the Dragon School in Oxford. From an early age he was interested in spy novels carrying around Buchan's Greenmantle and Kipling's Kim. While at the Dragon he played rugby and shot at Bisley.

During his national service, he was commissioned in the  Royal Hampshire Regiment in January 1950 and served as a subaltern in the King's African Rifles in the same battalion as Lance-Corporal Idi Amin.

Before turning full-time author, he was an ITN reporter and newscaster for two years, the New York City correspondent of Lord Beaverbrook's The Sunday Express, and then worked for nearly twenty years on The Times; five as its chief reporter, and latterly as a Middle East and Far East specialist. In the 1950s, he edited the West African news magazine Drum, sister paper to the South African Drum.

Hopkirk travelled widely over many years in the regions where his six books are set – Russia, Central Asia, the Caucasus, China, India, Pakistan, Iran, and eastern Turkey.

He sought a life in dangerous situations as a journalist, being sent to Algeria to cover the revolutionary crisis in the French colonial administration. Inspired by Fitzroy Maclean's Eastern Approaches he began to think about the Far East. During the Bay of Pigs fiasco in 1961 he was based in New York covering the events for the Express.

Hopkirk was twice arrested and held in secret police cells, once in Cuba, where he was accused of spying for the US Government; his contacts in Mexico obtained his release. In the Middle East, he was hijacked by Arab terrorists in Beirut, which led to his expulsion. The PLO hijacked his plane, a KLM jet bound for Amsterdam at the height of the economic oil crises in 1974. Hopkirk confronted them and persuaded the armed gang to surrender their weapons.

His works have been officially translated into fourteen languages, and unofficial versions in local languages are apt to appear in the bazaars of Central Asia. In 1999, he was awarded the Sir Percy Sykes Memorial Medal for his writing and travels by the Royal Society for Asian Affairs. Much of his research came from the India Office archives in the British Library (in London's St Pancras).

Hopkirk's wife Kathleen Hopkirk wrote A Traveller's Companion to Central Asia, published by John Murray in 1994.

Hopkirk died on 22 August 2014 at the age of 83.

Awards 
 Sir Percy Sykes Memorial Prize (1999)

Works 
Foreign Devils on the Silk Road: The Search for the Lost Cities and Treasures of Chinese Central Asia, 1980
on early European explorations of the Taklamakan Desert
Trespassers on the Roof of the World: The Race for Lhasa, 1982
Setting the East Ablaze: Lenin's Dream of an Empire in Asia, 1984
The Great Game: On Secret Service in High Asia, John Murray, 1990, 
The Great Game: The Struggle for Empire in Central Asia, Kodansha International, 1992, 
On Secret Service East of Constantinople: The Great Game and the Great War, 1994 
published in the US as: Like Hidden Fire: The Plot to Bring Down the British Empire, 1995
on plots by the Germans to raise Central Asia against the British during World War I
Quest for Kim: in Search of Kipling's Great Game, 1996;
a travelogue to the locations of Kipling's novel Kim

Testimonials
Patrick Leigh Fermor in The Daily Telegraph nominated The Great Game for the Book of the Year.  Edward Said in Punch magazine called it a "superb account" and the FT declared it to be "immensely readable and magisterial".  Hopkirk, wrote Lord Longford, displayed "astonishing erudition."

References

Citations

Sources 
 Secondary sources

External links 
Peter Hopkirk - Historian of 'The Great Game'
Peter Hopkirk
Farewell, Peter Hopkirk, And Thank You

British historians
British military historians
British male journalists
1930 births
2014 deaths
Central Asian studies scholars
King's African Rifles officers
People educated at The Dragon School
Royal Hampshire Regiment officers